A referendum on the monarchy was held in Rwanda on 25 September 1961, concurrent with parliamentary elections. The referendum asked two questions: whether the monarchy should be retained after independence the following year, and whether the incumbent, Kigeli V, should remain King.

The result was a "no" to both questions from 80% of voters, with a 95% turnout. King Kigeli claimed the vote had been rigged.

Results

Question one

Question two

References

1961 in Rwanda
1961 referendums
1961
Monarchy referendums